Trichoptilus is a genus of moths in the family Pterophoridae.

Species
Trichoptilus animosus 
Trichoptilus archeaodes 
Trichoptilus ceramodes 
Trichoptilus cryphias 
Trichoptilus festus 
Trichoptilus inclitus 
Trichoptilus negotiosus 
Trichoptilus pelias 
Trichoptilus potentellus 
Trichoptilus pygmaeus 
Trichoptilus regalis 
Trichoptilus scythrodes 
Trichoptilus subtilis  (=Trichoptilus maceratus)
Trichoptilus varius 
Trichoptilus viduus 
Trichoptilus vivax

Former species
Trichoptilus bidens is now Prichotilus bidens 

Oxyptilini
Moth genera